Ophiorrhabda is a genus of moths belonging to the family Tortricidae.

Species
Ophiorrhabda cellifera (Meyrick, 1912)
Ophiorrhabda deceptor (Diakonoff, 1966)
Ophiorrhabda ergasima (Meyrick, 1911)
Ophiorrhabda favillosa Diakonoff, 1973
Ophiorrhabda harmonica (Meyrick, 1905)
Ophiorrhabda leveri (Bradley, 1954)
Ophiorrhabda mormopa (Meyrick, 1906)
Ophiorrhabda mysterica (Turner, 1916)
Ophiorrhabda phaeosigma (Turner, 1916)
Ophiorrhabda philocompsa (Meyrick, 1921)
Ophiorrhabda quartaria (Diakonoff, 1973)
Ophiorrhabda scaristis (Meyrick, 1911)
Ophiorrhabda tokui (Kawabe, 1974)
Ophiorrhabda unicolor (Diakonoff, 1973)

See also
List of Tortricidae genera

References

External links
tortricidae.com

Olethreutini
Tortricidae genera
Taxa named by Alexey Diakonoff